Retropinna is a genus in the family Retropinnidae containing one species that is widespread in southeastern Australia, one from Tasmania and one from New Zealand.

Species
There are currently three recognized species in this genus:
 Retropinna retropinna (J. Richardson, 1848) (Cucumberfish, New Zealand smelt)
 Retropinna semoni (M. C. W. Weber, 1895) (Australian smelt)
 Retropinna tasmanica McCulloch, 1920 (Tasmanian smelt)

References

 
Ray-finned fish genera
Taxa named by Theodore Gill